Minute to Win It Indonesia is an Indonesian primetime game show based on television shows in United States with the same name. This is still production handled by Endemol Shine Group and NBCUniversal. This show has been broadcast on MNCTV on 2017 and debuted on July 17, 2017 on 4:30 pm (16:30 WIB) after news program Lintas Petang or Lintas iNews Sore, nor maybe after the cartoon program Shaun The Sheep. The show sponsors are Komix Herbal Lemon but uncredited in the beginning until the end.

Gameplay and location
Contestants take part in a series of 60-second challenges that use objects that are commonly available around the house. Contestants will be faced with blueprints to give an instructions of the game. Contestants must complete the first game to win the first level with a prize Rp1.000.000, as well as other games to 10 games completed will won the grand prize, Rp100,000,000. The difficulty of the games progressively increase throughout the show. If time expires or the conditions of the game cannot be fulfilled (such as by the contestant exhausting any allotted attempts or committing a foul), the contestant loses a "life". If the contestant loses all three of their "lives", the game ends and the contestant's winnings drop to the previous milestone they passed. After successfully completing a game, the contestant can leave with the amount of money already won before seeing the blueprint for the next game. However, once the contestant elects for the game, the contestant cannot leave the show until that game is complete or they have exhausted all three of their "lives". Here is list of a money tree:

NOTE: Bold rows are the safe levels, if the contestant(s) clear the safe levels, the cash prize on the safe level is guaranteed.

References

Minute to Win It
Indonesian game shows
2017 Indonesian television series debuts
2018 Indonesian television series endings
Television series by Universal Television
Indonesian television series based on American television series
MNCTV original programming